Chingeltei is one of nine Düüregs (districts) of the Mongolian capital Ulaanbaatar. It is subdivided into 18 Khoroos (subdistricts).

Chingeltei is located in the north, at the foot of one of the four mountains of Ulaanbaatar, the Chingeltei Uul.

See also
Central Museum of Dinosaurs of Mongolia

References 

Districts of Ulaanbaatar